Martin Sexton (15 September 1878 – 24 February 1966) was an Irish politician. He was elected to Dáil Éireann as a Fianna Fáil Teachta Dála (TD) for the Clare constituency at the September 1927 general election. He was re-elected at the 1932 general election but lost his seat at the 1933 general election. He was an unsuccessful candidate at the 1938 general election.

References

1878 births
1966 deaths
Fianna Fáil TDs
Members of the 6th Dáil
Members of the 7th Dáil
Politicians from County Clare